Louis Fleury (24 May 1878 – 10 June 1926) was a French flautist, pupil of Paul Taffanel at the Paris Conservatoire. Claude Debussy dedicated the piece for solo flute Syrinx to him in 1913, and Fleury performed the première. In 1921 English composer Cyril Rootham dedicated to Louis Fleury a "Suite in Three Movements" for flute and piano.

Fleury was a pioneer in the rediscovery of many forgotten Baroque flute compositions, and in commissioning new pieces by contemporary composers. He was a member of the Société Moderne des Instruments à Vent, which was set up for this purpose.

Notes

French classical flautists
1878 births
1926 deaths